The Opel Grandland (Vauxhall Grandland in the United Kingdom) is a compact crossover SUV which is produced by the German manufacturer Opel and its British twin-sister brand Vauxhall. It was originally known as the Opel and Vauxhall Grandland X when it was introduced to the markets. It was introduced at the 2017 Frankfurt Motor Show as the replacement for the Opel Antara. It also replaced the Opel Zafira MPV in August 2019, and is currently sold in Europe and South Africa.

Overview 
Plans for the Grandland X were known as early as May 2012, before PSA Peugeot Citroën officially indicated in December of that year that it would build the eventual replacement for the Zafira. Opel started taking orders for the Grandland X in June 2017, and more than 100,000 orders were made by September 2018.

The Grandland is based on the PSA EMP2 platform which is shared with related models which include the Peugeot 3008 II, Peugeot 5008 II, DS 7 Crossback and Citroën C5 Aircross. However, its design intellectual property was registered by General Motors as the vehicle was developed under its ownership.

Pre-facelift

Facelift 
In 2021, the Grandland X received a facelift and was renamed to "Opel Grandland", ditching the 'X' suffix.

Sales

Notes

References

Cars introduced in 2017
Compact sport utility vehicles
Grandland X
Crossover sport utility vehicles
Plug-in hybrid vehicles